is a Japanese manga series written and illustrated by Hideki. It was serialized in Kodansha's Weekly Shōnen Magazine from April 2018 to March 2022.

Publication
She's Adopted a High School Boy!, written and illustrated by Hideki, was serialized in Kodansha's Weekly Shōnen Magazine from April 11, 2018, to March 30, 2022. Kodansha collected its chapters into thirteen individual tankōbon volumes, which were published from August 17, 2018 to May 17, 2022. A promotional video for the seventh volume, featuring Kensho Ono as protagonist Minoru Soramoto, was launched on July 17, 2020.

In July 2021, it was announced that BookWalker Global partnered with Kodansha USA to publish the manga digitally in English, starting on August 3 of the same year.

Volume list

Reception
The manga ranked second in Pixiv Comic Ranking 2018 in the slice of life category.

Notes

References

External links
  

Kodansha manga
Romantic comedy anime and manga
Shōnen manga
Slice of life anime and manga